The 2011 U.S. F2000 Cooper Tires Winterfest was the first winter racing series promoted by the U.S. F2000 National Championship. It consisted of five races held during two race meets in January 2011. It served as preparation for the 2011 U.S. F2000 National Championship and was contested using 2010 rules.

The championship saw only a handful of entries. Zach Veach won the championship over Andretti Autosport teammate Spencer Pigot by six points as they each won two races. Vinícius Perdigão won the first race but faded to fourth in the championship. J. R. Smart was the only National Class entrant and won that championship by default.

Drivers and teams

Race calendar and results
The race schedule was announced on September 30, 2010.

Championship standings

Drivers'

See also
2011 IndyCar Series season

References

U.S. F2000 National Championship seasons
U.S. F2000 Winterfest
U.S. F2000 Winterfest